Donald Clarence Simpson (October 29, 1943 – January 19, 1996) was an American film producer, screenwriter, and actor. Simpson and his producing partner Jerry Bruckheimer produced hit films such as Flashdance (1983), Beverly Hills Cop (1984), Top Gun (1986), and The Rock (1996). At the time of his death in 1996, Simpson's films' total gross was $3 billion worldwide.

Early life
Simpson was born in Seattle, Washington, to June Hazel (née Clark), a housewife, and Russell J. Simpson, a mechanic at Boeing at the time of his son's birth. He grew up in Juneau, Alaska. His parents were strict Baptists and Simpson would go to church four to five times a week. He would call himself a "straight-A Bible student". He attended West Anchorage High School and later majored in English at the University of Oregon. Upon graduation, Simpson worked as a ski instructor in Utah. He later moved to San Francisco where he worked for a theatrical advertising agency and did public relations for the First International Erotic Film Festival.

Career

1970s & 1980s: Paramount Studios 
In the early 1970s, Simpson started working for Jack Wodell & Associates in San Francisco before moving to Los Angeles. Where he got a job marketing exploitation films for Warner Bros in 1972, handling distribution marketing for the movies Woodstock and A Clockwork Orange. 

In 1975 Simpson went into an interview with Paramount Pictures. He was referred by his friend Steve Tisch, nephew of Larry Tisch (who later owned CBS and Westinghouse), for the job Steve Tisch turned down. Steve Tisch would later go on to produce Risky Business, Forrest Gump and more. Jerry Bruckheimer, who was already friends with Simpson, loaned his personal car to Simpson to drive to the interview.

While there, he co-wrote the 1976 film Cannonball, in which he also had a small role. By 1977, he was named vice-president of production at Paramount, and president in 1981. He was fired at Paramount in 1982 after passing out during a studio meeting due to drug use. He was working on eight productions at once, and would regularly throw a tantrum while in production.

Soon after, he forged a partnership with fellow producer Jerry Bruckheimer. The two would go on to produce some of the most financially successful films of the 1980s: Flashdance (1983), Beverly Hills Cop (1984), Top Gun (1986) and Beverly Hills Cop II (1987). In 1985 and again in 1988, he and Bruckheimer were named Producers of the Year by the National Association of Theatre Owners. The success of Flashdance prompted Simpson and Bruckheimer to launch their own production company, that was affiliated with Paramount Pictures.

1990s 
In 1990, Simpson and Bruckheimer signed a five-year deal with Paramount worth a reported $300 million. The deal would prove to be short lived. Later that year, the Simpson/Bruckheimer-produced Days of Thunder starring Tom Cruise was released. The auto racing film received mixed reviews and grossed $158 million (on a $60 million budget). While a financial success, it did not match the success of Simpson and Bruckheimer's previous films. Simpson and Bruckheimer blamed Paramount for the film's lackluster box-office returns, saying the studio rushed its planning and release. Paramount blamed the film's performance on Simpson and Bruckheimer's overspending. The duo parted with Paramount shortly thereafter.

In 1991, the two signed with Disney. Their first film for Disney, The Ref (1994), was a financial flop. Their next films, Dangerous Minds, Crimson Tide, and Bad Boys (distributed by Columbia Pictures rather than Disney), all released in 1995, brought them back to success.

Personal life
Simpson never married and lived alone in a mansion in Coldwater Canyon in Beverly Hills.

In the 1970s, Simpson took classes to join the Church of Scientology but quit after spending $25,000 and not seeing any significant personal improvements. During the shooting of Days of Thunder, Simpson threw David Miscavige off the production because he refused to pay for a more expensive Scientology-patented sound recording device.

Personality
Simpson was known for his brash personality, provocative comments and questionable claims. Of director Steven Spielberg, Simpson said, "I'm surprised for a smart Jew he's as white-bread as he is." He later said, "Any person who suggested David Lynch for Dune should have every part of their anatomy examined." He said several times that, as a producer, "our obligation is to make money". Simpson worked out every day with special equipment provided by Arnold Schwarzenegger.

Simpson claimed he discovered Michael Mann, launched Debra Winger's career and cast Richard Gere for American Gigolo. He also claimed he created the concept for Beverly Hills Cop, which Michael Eisner denied. In the movie industry, professionals working with Simpson would refer to the "Don Simpson Discount Factor" (DSDF, coined by Jeff Katzenberg), a way to tone down his exaggerations.

Due to their films' success, Simpson and Bruckheimer became very rich. They often dressed in similar clothing, choosing black as their signature color. Simpson would wear black Levi 501 jeans only before their first wash and then throw them away. He frequented the Canyon Ranch in Arizona for occasional workouts and tanning. Though Simpson claimed he never underwent any plastic surgery procedures, there are reports that he underwent ten different plastic surgeries between 1988 and 1994, including a penis-enlargement procedure. Those surgeries eventually led to infection and many reversal procedures.

As Simpson and Bruckheimer's success grew, so did Simpson's reputation as a "party animal". He said that "next to eating and having sex, making movies is the best thing in the world". Simpson's debauched lifestyle was well known in Hollywood and has been documented in a number of sources. He was a fixture on the "Hollywood cocaine-party" circuit throughout the 1970s and '80s, and in his later years became known for throwing lavish all-night parties at his mansion. An entire chapter of the book You'll Never Make Love in This Town Again (which describes four prostitutes' stories about their sexual encounters with Hollywood celebrities) discusses his frequent sex parties and preference for S & M. He also gave himself testosterone shots to boost his sex drive. According to the call girl Alexandra Datig, Simpson auditioned struggling actresses for his movies, convinced them to have sex with him, and secretly filmed their sex acts.

Drug addiction
Simpson had been using cocaine since the 1980s, but increased his usage over the years. The excessive spending (in both films and his personal life) and erratic mood swings caused by his drug use were well known in Hollywood by the 1990s. In a 1994 interview with The New York Times, Simpson tried to downplay his reputation and claimed that while he had done drugs in the past, he had stopped. He claimed that his only addiction at the time was food. According to screenwriter James Toback, Simpson's drug use never stopped, and prompted David Geffen and Jeffrey Katzenberg to stage an intervention to get Simpson to go to rehab.

Simpson refused to admit himself into a traditional rehab facility. In 1995, he employed Dr. Stephen Ammerman to help him with his addiction. Ammerman, who had a history of drug abuse himself, believed that in order for Simpson to quit drugs, he had to use other drugs to combat the painful withdrawal symptoms. Ammerman designed what has been called a "dangerously unorthodox" detox program, which included several medications (including morphine) for Simpson to take at home. In August 1995 Ammerman died of what was later determined to be an accidental overdose of cocaine, Valium, venlafaxine, and morphine.

Frustrated with Simpson's escalating drug use and declining work, Bruckheimer terminated their partnership in December 1995. The two agreed to finish work on The Rock, which was already in production. Simpson died before production was completed and the film is dedicated to his memory.

Death
On January 19, 1996, Simpson was found dead in the bathroom of his Bel Air, Los Angeles, home. His death was initially attributed to "natural causes". An autopsy and toxicology report later determined that Simpson had died of heart failure caused by combined drug intoxication (cocaine and prescription medications). At the time of his death, there were 21 different drugs in his system, including antidepressants, stimulants, sedatives, and tranquilizers. In August 1996, investigative reporter Chuck Philips of the Los Angeles Times revealed that Simpson had been obtaining large quantities of prescription drugs from 15 different doctors, and that police found 2,200 prescription pills lined up in alphabetical order in his bedroom closet.

A 1998 book by journalist Charles Fleming reported that Simpson's prescription drug expenses totaled more than $60,000 a month at the time of his death. He called Simpson "a supercharged simple-minded creature, an Aesop's fable on crystal meth".

Following his death, his brother Lary Simpson had his own production banner, in order to develop products originated by Don Simpson himself in 1997.

Filmography
He was a producer in all films unless otherwise noted.

Film

As an actor

As writer

Television

Posthumous credits

References

Further reading

External links

 

1943 births
1996 deaths
20th-century American businesspeople
20th-century American male actors
20th-century American male writers
20th-century American screenwriters
American male film actors
American male screenwriters
Businesspeople from Anchorage, Alaska
Businesspeople from Seattle
Cocaine-related deaths in California
Film producers from Washington (state)
Male actors from Anchorage, Alaska
Male actors from Seattle
Screenwriters from Alaska
Screenwriters from Washington (state)
Paramount Pictures executives
University of Oregon alumni
Writers from Anchorage, Alaska
Writers from Seattle